On the Record: Over 150 of the most talented people in music share the secrets of their success (2004) is a book written by entertainment manager Guy Oseary and published in 2004 by Penguin Books.

The book features in-depth interviews with more than 150 music recording artists, record executives, A&R executives, label chiefs, songwriters, and record producers. Oseary spoke with performers like James Brown and Bono, asking them a similar set of questions about their experiences in music. In writing the book, Oseary also offered a personal reflection on how to succeed in the music industry.

Interviewees 
Some of the music elite who were interviewed for the book:

Artists:

 James Brown
 Elton John
 Bono
 Madonna
 Ozzy Osbourne
 Keith Richards
 Brian Wilson
 Alicia Keys
 Fiona Apple
 John Frusciante

Producers/Songwriters:

 Rick Rubin
 Sir George Martin
 Jermaine Dupri
 Giorgio Moroder
 David Foster
 Daniel Lanois

A&R Wizards and Executives:

 Lyor Cohen
 Tom Whalley
 Guy Oseary
 Ron Handler
 Bruce Lundvall
 John Kalodner

Legends:

 Quincy Jones
 Russell Simmons
 Dick Clark
 Seymour Stein
 Chris Blackwell
 Ahmet Ertegün
 Berry Gordy

Attorneys:

 John Branca
 Fred Davis
 Eric Greenspan
 Don Passman

Managers:

 Irving Azoff
 Paul McGuinness
 Benny Medina

Television and Film:

 Judy McGrath
 Tom Freston
 John Sykes
 McG

References

Further reading

External links 
 On the Record at Google Books

Music books
Penguin Books books